In mathematics, mixing is an abstract concept originating from physics: the attempt to describe the irreversible thermodynamic process of mixing in the everyday world: mixing paint, mixing drinks, industrial mixing, etc.

The concept appears in ergodic theory—the study of stochastic processes and measure-preserving dynamical systems. Several different definitions for mixing exist, including strong mixing, weak mixing and topological mixing, with the last not requiring a measure to be defined. Some of the different definitions of mixing can be arranged in a hierarchical order; thus, strong mixing implies weak mixing. Furthermore, weak mixing (and thus also strong mixing) implies ergodicity: that is, every system that is weakly mixing is also ergodic (and so one says that mixing is a "stronger" notion than ergodicity).

Informal explanation
The mathematical definition of mixing aims to capture the ordinary every-day process of mixing, such as mixing paints, drinks, cooking ingredients,  industrial process mixing, smoke in a smoke-filled room, and so on.

The set  is understood to be the total space to be filled: the mixing bowl, the smoke-filled room, etc. The measure  is understood to define the natural volume of the space  and of its subspaces. Thus, conventionally,  consists of the measurable subsets—the subsets that do have a volume. It is always taken to be a Borel set—the collection of subsets that can be constructed by taking intersections, unions and set complements; these can always be taken to be measurable. 

The time evolution of the system is described by a map . Given some subset , its map  will in general be a deformed version of  – it is squashed or stretched, folded or cut into pieces. Mathematical examples include the baker's map and the horseshoe map, both inspired by bread-making. Such a system is "measure-preserving" (area-preserving, volume-preserving).

A formal difficulty arises when one tries to reconcile the volume of sets with the need to preserve their size under a map. Worse, a single point  has no size. It has the important property of not "losing track" of where things came from. More strongly, it has the important property that any (measure-preserving) map  is the inverse of some map . The proper definition of a volume-preserving map is one for which  because  describes all the pieces-parts that  came from.

One is now interested in studying the time evolution of the system. If every set  behaves in this way, the system is a conservative system, placed in contrast to a dissipative system, where some subsets  wander away, never to be returned to. An example would be water running downhill -- once it's run down, it will never come back up again. The lake that forms at the bottom of this river can, however, become well-mixed. The ergodic decomposition theorem states that every ergodic system can be split into two parts: the conservative part, and the dissipative part.

Mixing is a stronger statement than ergodicity.

The above definition of topological mixing should be enough to provide an informal idea of mixing (it is equivalent to the formal definition, given below). Several, actually; one has both strong mixing and weak mixing; they are inequivalent, although a strong mixing system is always weakly mixing. The measure-based definitions are not compatible with the definition of topological mixing: there are systems which are one, but not the other. The general situation remains cloudy: for example, given three sets , one can define 3-mixing. As of 2020, it is not known if 2-mixing implies 3-mixing. (If one thinks of ergodicity as "1-mixing", then it is clear that 1-mixing does not imply 2-mixing; there are systems that are ergodic but not mixing.)

The concept of strong mixing is made in reference to the volume of a pair of sets. Consider, for example, a set  of colored dye that is being mixed into a cup of some sort of sticky liquid, say, corn syrup, or shampoo, or the like. Practical experience shows that mixing sticky fluids can be quite hard: there is usually some corner of the container where it is hard to get the dye mixed into. Pick as set  that hard-to-reach corner. The question of mixing is then, can , after a long enough period of time, not only penetrate into  but also fill  with the same proportion as it does elsewhere?

One phrases the definition of strong mixing as the requirement that 

The product  is a bit more subtle. Imagine that the volume  is 10% of the total volume, and that the volume of dye  will also be 10% of the grand total. That is,  This product-of-volumes has more than passing resemblance to Bayes theorem in probabilities; this is not an accident, but rather a consequence that measure theory and probability theory are the same theory: they share the same axioms (the Kolmogorov axioms), even as they use different notation.

 was used to define the concept of a measure-preserving map. When looking at how much dye got mixed into the corner , one wants to look at where that dye "came from" (presumably, it was poured in at the top, at some time in the past). One must be sure that every place it might have "come from" eventually gets mixed into .

Mixing in dynamical systems
Let  be a measure-preserving dynamical system, with T being the time-evolution or shift operator. The system is said to be strong mixing if, for any , one has

A dynamical system is said to be weak mixing if one has

In other words,  is strong mixing if  in the usual sense, weak mixing if

in the Cesàro sense, and ergodic if  in the Cesàro sense. Hence, strong mixing implies weak mixing, which implies ergodicity. However, the converse is not true: there exist ergodic dynamical systems which are not weakly mixing, and weakly mixing dynamical systems which are not strongly mixing. The Chacon system was historically the first example given of a system that is weak-mixing but not strong-mixing.

L2 formulation 

The properties of ergodicity, weak mixing and strong mixing of a measure-preserving dynamical system can also be characterized by the average of observables.

A dynamical system  is weakly mixing if, for any functions  and 

A dynamical system  is strongly mixing if, for any function  the sequence  converges weakly to  i.e., for any function 

Since the system is assumed to be measure preserving, this last line is equivalent to saying that the covariance  so that the random variables  and  become orthogonal as  grows. Actually, since this works for any function  one can informally see mixing as the property that the random variables  and  become independent as  grows.

Products of dynamical systems

Given two measured dynamical systems  and  one can construct a dynamical system  on the Cartesian product by defining  We then have the following characterizations of weak mixing:

Proposition. A dynamical system  is weakly mixing if and only if, for any ergodic dynamical system , the system  is also ergodic.

Proposition. A dynamical system  is weakly mixing if and only if  is also ergodic. If this is the case, then  is also weakly mixing.

Generalizations

The definition given above is sometimes called strong 2-mixing, to distinguish it from higher orders of mixing.  A strong 3-mixing system may be defined as a system for which

holds for all measurable sets A, B, C.  We can define strong k-mixing similarly.  A system which is strong k-mixing for all k = 2,3,4,... is called mixing of all orders.

It is unknown whether strong 2-mixing implies strong 3-mixing.  It is known that strong m-mixing implies ergodicity.

Examples

Irrational rotations of the circle, and more generally irreducible translations on a torus, are ergodic but neither strongly nor weakly mixing with respect to the Lebesgue measure.

Many maps considered as chaotic are strongly mixing for some well-chosen invariant measure, including: the dyadic map, Arnold's cat map, horseshoe maps, Kolmogorov automorphisms, and the Anosov flow (the geodesic flow on the unit tangent bundle of compact manifolds of negative curvature.)

Topological mixing

A form of mixing may be defined without appeal to a measure, using only the topology of the system.  A continuous map  is said to be topologically transitive if, for every pair of non-empty open sets , there exists an integer n such that

where  is the nth iterate of f. In the operator theory, a topologically transitive bounded linear operator (a continuous linear map on a topological vector space) is usually called hypercyclic operator. A related idea is expressed by the wandering set.

Lemma: If X is a complete metric space with no isolated point, then f is topologically transitive if and only if there exists a hypercyclic point , that is, a point x such that its orbit  is dense in X.

For a continuous-time system,  is replaced by the flow , with g being the continuous parameter, with the requirement that a non-empty intersection hold for all .

A weak topological mixing is one that has no non-constant continuous (with respect to the topology) eigenfunctions of the shift operator.

Topological mixing neither implies, nor is implied by either weak or strong mixing: there are examples of systems that are weak mixing but not topologically mixing, and examples that are topologically mixing but not strong mixing.

Mixing in stochastic processes
Let  be a stochastic process on a probability space . The sequence space into which the process maps can be endowed with a topology, the product topology. The open sets of this topology are called cylinder sets. These cylinder sets generate a σ-algebra, the Borel σ-algebra; this is the smallest σ-algebra that contains the topology.

Define a function , called the strong mixing coefficient, as

for all .

Mixing in Markov processes 
Suppose  were a stationary Markov process with stationary distribution  and let  denote the space of Borel-measurable functions that are square-integrable with respect to the measure . Also let

denote the conditional expectation operator on  Finally, let

denote the space of square-integrable functions with mean zero.

The ρ-mixing coefficients of the process {xt} are

 

For a stationary Markov process, the coefficients ρt may either decay at an exponential rate, or be always equal to one.

The α-mixing coefficients of the process {xt} are

 

 

The α-mixing coefficients are always smaller than the ρ-mixing ones: , therefore if the process is ρ-mixing, it will necessarily be α-mixing too. However, when , the process may still be α-mixing, with sub-exponential decay rate.

The β-mixing coefficients are given by

 

 

A strictly stationary Markov process is β-mixing if and only if it is an aperiodic recurrent Harris chain. The β-mixing coefficients are always bigger than the α-mixing ones, so if a process is β-mixing it will also be α-mixing. There is no direct relationship between β-mixing and ρ-mixing: neither of them implies the other.

References

 V. I. Arnold and A. Avez, Ergodic Problems of Classical Mechanics, (1968) W. A. Benjamin, Inc. 
 Achim Klenke, Probability Theory, (2006) Springer 
 

Ergodic theory